Bandur may refer to:

Bandur, a town in Limpopo Province, South Africa
Bandur (Karnataka), a settlement in Karnataka, India

People with the surname
Maggie Bandur, American screenwriter
Jovan Bandur, Yugoslavian classic composer